All Together Now is a British reality television music competition which first aired on BBC One on 27 January 2018. It is presented by Rob Beckett and Geri Halliwell (credited as Geri Horner). Michael Rice was crowned the winner of the first series on 3 March 2018. A second series was announced on 28 March 2018.

The Performers
The Performers are a mix of soloists and groups. They were cast to include a diverse range of ages, backgrounds and genres, including pop, rock, soul, jazz, musicals, and classical. The casting was open to all and the show attracted performers with minimal public performance experience through to seasoned performers who have appeared on major stages and theatres.

Performances
Result's colour key
 Artist advanced to the final with the highest score
 Artist did not score enough points to place inside the Top 3 
 Artist advanced to the sing-off in 2nd and 3rd place

Heat 1 (27 January)
Opening song: "I've Got the Music in Me" – The Kiki Dee Band (Solos: Larissa, Maxine, Nigel, Nathaniel, Kiki, James, Milad, Divina, Geri, Mr Fabulous and Lindsay)

Michael advanced to the final.

Sing-Off details

Heat 2 (3 February)
End Song:"Best Song Ever" – One Direction

 Running order

Tabi advanced to the final.

Sing-Off details

Heat 3 (10 February)
Ending Song:"I'm Still Standing" — Elton John
Running order

Jodie advanced to the final.

Sing-Off details

Heat 4 (17 February)
End Song:"Flashdance... What a Feeling" from  Flashdance
 Running order

Victoria advanced to the final.

Sing-Off details

Heat 5 (24 February)
End Song: The Edge of Glory – Lady Gaga
 Running order

James advanced to the final.

Sing-Off details

The Final (3 March)
Beginning Song: "Greatest Day" — Take That
End Song: "Can't Stop the Feeling — Justin Timberlake
Running order

Sing-Off details

The 100

The 100 are a range of music experts and performers from across the UK. Members of the 100 include:
 Geri Horner, former member of the Spice Girls.
 Andy McGeoch, a jingle writer and lead singer with rock band Tasty.
 Kelly Wilde, an 80's singer and UK cabaret artist.
 Daisy Dance, formally known as Daizy Agnew, a singer-songwriter and member of UK girlband Girls Can't Catch.
 Lindsay Dracass, who represented the United Kingdom in the Eurovision Song Contest 2001.
 Gabz, a rapper who was a finalist on Britain's Got Talent in 2013.
 Divina de Campo (Owen Farrow), a drag queen who runs a cabaret bar in Manchester called Kiki, and who would later be a runner-up in RuPaul's Drag Race UK.
 Nikki Lamborn - Singer, Vocal Coach, Actress. Vocalist with Band Never The Bride, London Vocal Coach. 
 Paulus, aka Paul Martin, a cabaret compere.
 James Lomas, the West End's original Billy Elliot in the musical.
 Lili Davies, a Romanian-born pub singer going by the name ‘Magic Betty’, who appeared on Britain's Got Talent in 2021.
 Lili La Scala, a cabaret singer.
 Chloe Akam, an opera and rock singer from Hampshire.
 Sophie Armstrong, a singer from Northumberland and part of the acoustic duo Summerland.
 Joanna Eden, a singer, pianist and vocal coach from Saffron Walden, who has worked with Sam Smith among others.
 Jordan Charles, a choir director and member of harmony group Vox Clever.
 Oriana Curls, a French jazz singer.
 Bee Bakare, a British-Nigerian singer and songwriter.
 Miggy Dela Rosa, a backing singer for George Michael among others.
 Harry Kersley, an operatic tenor.
 Charlie Healy, former lead singer of rock band The Risk and finalist of the 8th British series of The X Factor.
 Corene Campbell, a singer in the Soul trio Voices with Soul.
 Maria Grimsley and Tracey Richley, sisters that are a wedding-singer duo.
 Mark James, a vocal coach and performer.
 Chris Shannon, a singer from Kent who participated in Britain's Got Talent.
 Georg Tormann, a BRIT School vocal coach, who helped launch Ella Eyre's career, and founder of The London Concert Chorus.
 Jason Butler, an Open Mic UK finalist and karaoke bar owner from Wigan.
 Aaron Sokell, a singer/songwriter and vocal coach who has worked with the likes of Tom Jones and Beverley Knight.
 Simon Kindleysides, a singer-songwriter. The first wheelchair user judge on BBC One, and the first paralysed man to walk the London Marathon, in 2018.
 Lizzie Capener, an opera singer, and the first blind female TV judge.
 Grenville Jones, a choir director from Bath.
 Adam Dean, a Michael Bublé tribute act.
 Harmesh Gharu, Director of Commercial Music at Tring Park School for the Performing Arts.
 Sandy Grigelis, a singer/songwriter/musician and West End performer.
 Ash Stevenson, a singer from Bradford.
 Maryam Ghaffari, founder and director of the Got Soul Choir.
 Helen Garnett, member of harmony group The Garnett Family, who reached the semifinals of the 10th series of Britain's Got Talent.
 Mr Fabulous, aka Jay Kamiraz, a gospel choir director, Prince's Trust ambassador and Pride of Britain award winner.
 Tina T (her real name), a Motown & Soul singer, and a Tina Turner & Whitney Houston tribute act.
 Dylan Hutchinson, a musical theatre teacher and singer.
 Melissa Vaszi, a Canadian singer going by the name ‘Hunny B’.
 Donna Marie Trego, an award-winning Lady Gaga tribute act & impersonator. 
 Ed and Emma Saklatvala, married opera singers and singing teachers from Croydon.
 Kiki deVille, a vintage cabaret artiste.
 Maxine Brooks, the founder and director of Birmingham Community Gospel Choir.
 Ged Thompson, a choir singer from Sheffield.
 Jessica Cambray, a wedding singer from Radcliffe.
 Sharon Ashton, a singer and vocal coach.
 Steve Brewer, a pop & rock singer and Ed Sheeran tribute from Essex.
 Milad Shadrooh, the 'Singing Dentist', who is famous for his song parodies.
 Nathaniel Morrison, a West End performer and founder of the West End Gospel Choir.
 Zane Heath, a singer and dancer from Skegness.
 Suzanna Dee, a Singer/songwriter / Vocal arranger / Producer / Backing vocalist / Session singer 
 Larissa Eddie, a supporting singer for Peter Andre and Lionel Richie.
 Nigel Murfitt, a singer at the London tourist attraction the Medieval Banquet.
 Georgia Bray, who would the following year make it to Knockouts of The Voice UK series 8.
 Rob King, a singer and barman, who two years later would compete on Britain's Got Talent.

Ratings

References

External links
 

All Together Now (franchise)
2018 British television seasons